Scaredy Squirrel is a Canadian animated television series based very loosely on the Scaredy Squirrel book series by Mélanie Watt. The series premiered on April 1, 2011 on YTV in Canada and August 9, 2011 on Cartoon Network in the U.S. The final episode aired on August 17, 2013. The series also aired on Qubo from 2017 to 2020.

Production
The series was produced in association with YTV by Nelvana, with additional production facilities provided by Studio 306, Pipeline Studios Inc. and Super Sonics Productions Inc., with Dolby Digital doing the sound, with Writers Guild of Canada and ACTRA writing the show's renewal plates, with the series' funding provided by The Canada Media Fund and The Canadian Film or Video Production Tax Credit.

Plot
The series chronicles the adventures of Scaredy, an energetic anthropomorphic orange squirrel, and his best friend Dave, a blue skunk. Their antics take place in the fictional Balsa City, and often at the local supermarket the Stash "N" Hoard, where Scaredy works as a stacker.

Characters
 Scaredy Orville Squirrel  (voiced by Terry McGurrin) – A smart, germophobic, and occasionally shy orange squirrel who works as a stacker at a grocery store called Stash "N" Hoard and is fond of cleaning.
 David "Dave" Skunkerton Weeb (voiced by Jonathan Gould) – Scaredy's best friend who is a blue skunk. He is also dim-witted and is fond of being messy and farting.
 Nestor (voiced by Patrick McKenna) – Nestor is a yellow canary who is the manager of Stash "N" Hoard. He is also Scaredy's boss and also frenemies with him.
 Momma (voiced by Jayne Eastwood) – A grouchy, light pink canary who owns the Stash "N" Hoard, and who is Nestor's mother. Momma makes surprise appearances at any time, and is fond of firing people even those who don't work at the Stash "N" Hoard. Additionally, she appears to have little respect for her son Nestor and generally refuses to approve of him.
 Paddy (voiced by David Berni) – A gray, egotistical ferret who is always making trouble for Scaredy.
 Richard  (Voiced by  Jonathan Groff) – Richard is Scaredy's inanimate pet plant. Richard seems to be slightly sadistic, as seen when he forces Scaredy to wear the "Hat of Pain".
 Sally (voiced by Linda Kash) – A turquoise trout who is deeply in love with Scaredy. Sally is confident and thinks she and Scaredy could be a good couple, when in truth Scaredy is freaked out by her.
 Mildred (voiced by Jamie Watson) – A toad who works at the Stash "N" Hoard and seems to be Nestor's only friend. She is always seen drinking a bottle of soda and is constantly burping. She is also a secret spy but only Scaredy and Dave know.
 Bucky "Buck" Beaver (voiced by David Berni) – A beaver who works at the Stash "N" Hoard. He is friends with Hatton, Scaredy and Dave.
 Hatton (voiced by Dwayne Hill) – A mule who works at the Stash "N" Hoard. He is friends with Buck, Scaredy and Dave.
 Milly (voiced by Laurie Elliott) – A strange domestic cow that lives in Balsa City. Often seen dancing. She also licks Scaredy in his sleep.
 Philmore (voiced by Terry McGurrin) – An excited, nervous, fast-talking peacock who frequents the Stash "N" Hoard.
 Sue (voiced by Julie Lemieux) – A female version of Scaredy whom he develops a crush for, but later discovers is insane. She wears a green dress and has a ponytail. Despite being present in the theme song, her only appearance in the series was in the episode "Acting Silly".

Episodes

Broadcast
The series aired on YTV in Canada from April 1, 2011 with the final episode aired on August 17, 2013. Repeats aired until December 30, 2016.

The series aired on Cartoon Network in the U.S. from August 9, 2011 to June 22, 2013. It also aired on Qubo in the U.S. from March 27, 2017 to July 24, 2020.

The Latin American debut was on January 2, 2012. UK channel Pop started to air episodes January 5, 2013 (replacing Lab Rats Challenge), and was shown in regularly scheduled programming on Kix! (now Pop Max.) The Gaeilge debut was on TG4 Ireland in 2015.

As of August 30, 2021, the show is currently airing repeats on Cartoon Network and Disney XD in Canada.

The show is streaming on Tubi.

External links
 

2011 Canadian television series debuts
2013 Canadian television series endings
2010s Canadian animated television series
2010s Canadian workplace comedy television series
Canadian children's animated comedy television series
English-language television shows
Animated television series about squirrels
Animated television series about birds
Animated television series about fish
Television series by Nelvana